İsmail Yurtseven (born 5 July 1978), better known by his stage name İsmail YK, is a Turkish Pop-Arabesque singer and composer. YK stands for Yurtseven Kardeşler, the siblings group he was a member of at the start of his career. A number of his albums have been top sellers in Turkey. His first solo album Şappur Şuppur sold 1.2 million copies. In 2006 his second album Bombabomba.com was the best selling Turkish album with over 600,000 copies. In 2008, his third album Bas Gaza sold 450,000 copies. İsmail YK has won many awards including Best Turkish Arabesque-Fantasy singer that he won 3 times consecutively in 2006, 2007 and 2008.

İsmail YK, who accelerated his works after a long break, released his album Kıyamet on Valentine's Day 2015. The album consisted of 12 songs, including the song "Yaralıyım" from the album Haydi Bastır which was rerecorded with Hatice. The song "Çıkmam Seneye" which he had written at the age of 12 was included in the album as well.

İsmail YK rerecorded the rock version of the song "Allah Belanı Versin" (2006) and released a music video for it. In its 2006 music video he used an Alfa Romeo while for the new music video he used a Ferrari car. The songs and its music video were among the most discussed subjects on music news in Turkey within the first 3 days of its release. As to why he damaged the car in the music video he said that "he wanted to send this message that instead of hurting someone it's better to cause damage to materialistic things".

Discography

Albums
with Yurtseven Kardeşler
1996: Bir Tek Sen / Barış Olsun
1998: Toprak
2001: De Bana / Of Anam Of
2005: Şimdi Halay Zamanı
2007: Seni Hiç Aşık Oldun Mu?

Solo
2004: Şappur Şuppur
2006: Bombabomba.com
2008: Bas Gaza
2009: Haydi Bastır
2011: Psikopat
2012: Metropol
2015: Kıyamet
2018: Tansiyon

Singles
 "Bas Gaza" (2008)
 "One Minute" (2011)
 "Doğum Günün Haram Olsun" (2014)
 "Ah Leylim" (2015)
 "Allah Belanı Versin (Rock Versiyon)" (2016)
 "Geber" (2017)
 "80 80 160" (2017)
 "Meyhoş Oldum" (2018)
 "Kibarım" (2018)
 "Tansiyon" (2018)
 "Hep Seninle Olmak" (2019)
 "Çikolatam" (2019)
 "Yala Dur" (2019)
 "Oha" (2020)
 "Yaktırdın Bir Sigara" (2020)
 "Ayvayı Yemiş" (2020)
 "Hadi Ya" (2021)
 "Dokuz Mevsim (Acoustic)" (with Ece Mumay) (2021)
 "Aşkına Memnu" (2021)
 "Tatlı Kız" (2021)
 "Ağlarsan Ağla" (2021)
 "Cehennem" (2022)
 "Sen Gidemezsin" (2023)

Filmography 
 Selena (2006) Guest appearance
 Korkusuzlar (2007) İsmail
 Oyun Başladı (2009) Kanka

References

External links
 Ismail YK official web site
 Yurtseven Kardeşler official web site
Ismail YK Instagram

1978 births
21st-century German male singers
German people of Turkish descent
Turkish-language singers
People from Hamm
Living people
21st-century Turkish male singers